Cohnella is a genus of bacteria in the family Paenibacillaceae. Its species are Gram-positive, rod-shaped and endospore-forming.

References

Further reading

External links
LPSN

Paenibacillaceae